Hamid Reza Estili (born 1 April 1967) is an Iranian football coach and former player. Estili was a member of the Iran national team and is mostly remembered for his memorable goal and goal celebration against the United States at the 1998 FIFA World Cup.

Early life
Estili was born on 1 April 1967 in Nazi Abad, Tehran. His father was a businessman and his mother was a nurse. He began his career in football with playing in Pas Tehran in 1982.

Club career
Estili played for Al Qadisiya Kuwait, Bahman, Esteghlal Jonoub, Geylang United and Pas. His best years were spent at Persepolis.

After the 1998 FIFA World Cup he signed for FK Austria Wien, however due to unforeseen circumstances, he returned to Iran and played the remaining six years of his career at his beloved Persepolis FC.

In the famous Tehran derby played in 2000, he fought with Mohammad Navazi at the end of the match and was arrested by police. They were imprisoned in Qasr Prison for three days. He was suspended for the rest of the season.

He retired from competitive club football in 2004.

International career
Estili started playing football from an early age and was able to impress, eventually being called up the Iran football team. At age 23, he made his debut versus the USSR. He was known as the workhorse of the national team, but is mostly remembered for his memorable goal and goal celebration against USA at the 1998 FIFA World Cup. In 2015, he donated the jersey he wore in that match to the FIFA World Football Museum in Zürich, Switzerland.

Estili retired from international football after match against South Korea in 2000. He had 82 caps and 12 goals for the national team.

Coaching career

Assistant coach of Persepolis
Estili was appointed as assistant coach for Persepolis FC in 2004, as the assistant of Ali Parvin, and then Rainer Zobel. A few months after Arie Haan was chosen as the Head coach, he was sacked by him. After Haan left the team in August 2006, and Mustafa Denizli was signed as the head coach, Estili returned to his former position. On 13 January 2007, during the 2006–07 mid-season break, Estili left the team being sacked again, this time by Denizli due to problems with him. Denizli later stated that "It would be better for him to take some professional trainings", and Estili Compared Denizli's contract with the Treaty of Turkmenchay.

Estili was the assistant coach to Afshin Ghotbi, the head-coach of the club in the IPL 2007/08 season. However, with a lot of tension between the two coaches over the team selection, players, and other decisions it was foreseen that one of them will have to leave Perspolis F.C. at the end of the season. Ghotbi left at the end of the season, and Estili was touted as the new Perspolis manager. However, with Ghotbi's return, Estili left Perspolis.

Steel Azin
Estili was appointed as the head coach of the new promoted team Steel Azin in summer of 2009 and had many starts such as Ali Karimi, Mehdi Mahdavikia, Hossein Kaebi, Fereydoon Zandi, Amir Shapourzadeh and Alireza Vahedi Nikbakht but after failing to progress in Hazfi Cup and totally missing the chance of winning the league he was sacked on 19 April 2010.

On 20 September 2009; in the half time break of the match against Esteghlal, he experienced a squeal with Fereydoon Zandi. Zandi threw a bottle toward him, and Estili then slapped Zandi. The incident led to a fight.

Shahin Bushehr
Estili was appointed Head Coach of Shahin Bushehr on 1 June 2010 and was fired on 4 April 2011, replaced by Mahmoud Yavari. at the time he was sacked, Shahin were in 17th place out of 18, achieving 16 points in 18 matches.

Return to Persepolis as head coach
 
On 1 June 2011, it was announced that Estili was one of the candidates for coaching Persepolis, alongside Hamid Derakhshan and the current coach, Hazfi Cup winner Ali Daei. Chairman of the club, Habib Kashani, launched a "Technical Committee" consisting of Bijan Zolfagharnasab, Mohammad Panjali and Mohammad Zadmehr to select the next coach among the three. Daei exposed his proposal for 2011–12 season to the club, but he was unable to remain in the club due to tensions with Habib Kashani. Technical Committee stated a condition for Daei: "Daei Should communicate properly with Kashani", which he rejected.
On 21 June 2011, Estili was selected as head coach of Persepolis by "The Technical Committee".

Some fans believed that the Technical Committee was a show from Kashani to pull over Daei, and select his "beloved friend" Estili. In a Poll by Navad, 68% believed that "Estili won't be successful with Persepolis".

In the opening match of the season against Malavan, which ended 1–1 after the weak performance of Persepolis and late tying goal by Hossein Badamaki, fans started screaming the name of Ali Daei since 60th minute, showing their displeasure. protests continued in next matches by Booing Estili and Kashani, and slogans wanting them to leave the club. In a poll by Navad on 15 August 2011, 51% believed that the way Estili was chosen is the main reason of protests. Other reasons included weak performance by players (36%) and impatient fans (%13).

He led Persepolis in the 15 matches with five won, five defeats and five draws. He finally resigned on 9 December 2011 after a 3–0 home defeat to arch rivals Esteghlal in quarter-finals of 2011–12 Hazfi Cup.

On 27 November 2012, he was appointed as Persepolis Academy's Director by Mohammad Rouyanian.

Rah Ahan
On 26 June 2014, Estili was named as new manager of Rah Ahan.

Personal life
His younger brother, Masoud, was also a footballer and died in April 2011 after an accident.

Estili is an Iranian Azari. His father was born in Baku, Soviet Union and his mother is from Sarab. He was married in 1999 with Anahita Zahraee and has two daughters, Atena (born 2002) and Anita (born 2005). They are currently living in Saadat Abad.

Career statistics

Club

International

Scores and results list Iran's goal tally first, score column indicates score after each Estili goal.

Managerial statistics

Honours
Pas
Iranian Football League: 1991–92

Bahman
Hazfi Cup: 1994–95

Persepolis
Asian Cup Winners' Cup: runner-up 1992–93
Iranian Football League: 1998–99, 1999–2000, 2001–02
 Hazfi Cup: 1998–99

Iran
Asian Games Gold Medal: 1998

References

External links

 Estili's goal against the United States at 1998 FIFA World Cup on YouTube
 Archive of Hamid Reza Estili's international appearances at RSSSF
 Interview of Estili with Afshin Ghotbi (archived)

Iran international footballers
Association football midfielders
Pas players
Persepolis F.C. players
Persepolis F.C. non-playing staff
1992 AFC Asian Cup players
1996 AFC Asian Cup players
1998 FIFA World Cup players
2000 AFC Asian Cup players
Persepolis F.C. managers
Iranian expatriate footballers
Singapore Premier League players
Iranian football managers
Sportspeople from Tehran
1971 births
Expatriate footballers in Kuwait
Living people
Geylang International FC players
Asian Games gold medalists for Iran
Expatriate footballers in Singapore
Bahman players
Asian Games medalists in football
Footballers at the 1998 Asian Games
Medalists at the 1998 Asian Games
Popular Front of Islamic Revolution Forces politicians
Qadsia SC players
Kuwait Premier League players
Iranian expatriate sportspeople in Kuwait
Association football players not categorized by nationality
Persian Gulf Pro League managers
Shahin Bushehr F.C. managers
Malavan F.C. managers